Liv is the second studio album by the rock artist Livingston Taylor. It was released in 1971 on Capricorn Records. The album's eleven tracks include ten of Taylor's own songs, and a cover rendition of "On Broadway".

Track listing
All tracks composed by Livingston Taylor; except where indicated
"Get Out of Bed" – 2:49
"May I Stay Around" – 3:31
"Open Up Your Eyes" – 2:52
"Gentleman" – 3:14
"Easy Prey" – 4:42
"Be That Way" – 3:06
"Truck Driving Man" – 3:18
"Mom, Dad" – 2:40
"On Broadway" (Barry Mann, Cynthia Weil, Jerry Leiber, Mike Stoller) – 3:37
"Caroline" – 2:16
"I Just Can't Be Lonesome No More" – 2:46

Personnel
Livingston Taylor — Acoustic guitar, guitar, piano, keyboards, vocals
Greg Prestopino — Vocals, backing vocals 
Robert Popwell — Bass, guitar 
Walter Robinson — Bass, Acoustic bass 
Johnny Sandlin — Bass, guitar
Bill Stewart — Drums
Tommy Talton — Acoustic guitar, guitar 
David Woodford — Flute, tenor saxophone, wind
George Marino - Mastering Engineer

References

Liv
Liv
Albums produced by Jon Landau
Capricorn Records albums